Victoria Burgess Sawyer (born ) is a Republican member of the North Carolina Senate. She represents the Senate's 34th district which includes Iredell and Yadkin Counties. Sawyer was previously appointed to serve in the Senate for District 44 from August 2, 2018 to January 2019.

Committees and Legislative Activity
Senator Sawyer currently serves as Chairman of the Senate Transportation Committee and as Co-Chairman of the Senate Transportation Appropriations Committee. She also serves on the Senate Finance, Commerce & Insurance, Education, and Budget Committees. Sawyer also serves on the Executive Committee for the National Council of Insurance Legislators (NCOIL). In June, 2019, she was appointed to serve as Chairwoman of NCOIL's Special Committee on Natural Disaster Recovery.

Sawyer is actively involved in the following at the North Carolina General Assembly:
 The Joint Women's Caucus - Co-Chair
 The Sportsmen's Caucus - Member
 The Joint Arts Caucus - Member
 The Justus-Warren Heart Disease and Stroke Prevention Task Force - Co-Chair
 The Wine and Grape Caucus - Co-Chair 
 The Law Enforcement Caucus - Member
 The Advisory Committee on Cancer Coordination - Member
 The Legislative Ethics Committee - Member
 The Child Fatality Task Force - Member
 North Carolina Leadership Forum - Member
 Joint Legislative Commission on Governmental Operations - Member

In her home district, Sawyer serves on the board of trustees at her church, Rocky Mount United Methodist, and on the board of the Crosby Scholars of Iredell County.

Personal life
Senator Sawyer is a licensed Insurance agent in North Carolina. Since 2002, she and her husband, Brett, have owned and operated Sawyer Insurance & Financial Services, based in Mooresville, North Carolina with two locations serving the Lake Norman Area. They have Two daughters: Sydney and Braedy.

Sawyer is a graduate of Parkland High School in Winston-Salem. She is also an alumnus of UNC-Charlotte where she received a bachelor of arts degree in special education.

References

|-

|-

Living people
1970s births
People from Davidson County, North Carolina
People from Mooresville, North Carolina
University of North Carolina at Charlotte alumni
North Carolina Republicans
North Carolina state senators
Republican Party North Carolina state senators
Women state legislators in North Carolina
21st-century American politicians
21st-century American women politicians